The San Diego Legion is an American professional rugby union team based in San Diego, California. The team was founded in 2017 and competes in Major League Rugby.

Home field
The team plays at Snapdragon Stadium, which is located on the campus of the San Diego State University in Mission Valley and has a seating capacity of 35,000. The stadium is also the home of San Diego State Aztecs football and San Diego Wave FC. Due to the restrictions amidst the COVID-19 pandemic, the team temporarily relocated to Las Vegas, Nevada, for the 2021 season. However, they would return to San Diego on April 12, 2021.

Broadcasts
Select Legion 2021 home and away Major League Rugby games not already broadcast nationally on the CBS Sports Network are televised locally on FOX 5 San Diego and also streamed live on ESPN+ and archived on Legion's YouTube channel. YurView Channel 4 San Diego was the local broadcast partner for Legion games during its inaugural 2018 season, which concluded in June. Matt McCarthy and Marc Sterchbina are the commentators.

Sponsorship

Players and personnel

Current squad
The San Diego Legion team for the 2023 Major League Rugby season is:

 Senior 15s internationally capped players are listed in bold.
 MLR teams are allowed to field up to ten overseas players per match.

Head coaches
  Rob Hoadley (2018–2020)
  Zack Test (2020)
  Scott Murray (2020–2021)
  Danny Lee (2022–)

Captains
 Nate Augspurger (2018)

 Joe Pietersen (2019)

 Nate Augspurger (2020–present)

Records

Season standings

Notes

Honors
Major League Rugby
Runner-up: 2019
Playoff appearances: 2018, 2019

2018 season

° = Exhibition game
°° = Playoff semifinals at Infinity Park in Glendale, Colorado.

2019 season

Exhibition

Regular season

Post season

2020 season

On March 12, 2020, MLR announced the season would go on hiatus immediately for 30 days due to fears surrounding the 2019–2020 coronavirus pandemic. It was cancelled the following week

Regular season

2021 season

Regular season

2022 season

Regular season

Post season

References

External links
 

 
Major League Rugby teams
2017 establishments in California
Rugby clubs established in 2017
Rugby union teams in San Diego